In the Middle Ages, a pieve (plural pievi) was a rural church with a baptistery, upon which other churches without baptisteries depended.

The Italian word pieve is descended from Latin plebs which, after the expansion of Christianity in Italy, was applied to the community of baptized people. Many pievi began to appear in the 5th century, as Christianity expanded in the rural areas outside the main cities.  In the 9th-10th centuries, they were often designed with bell towers.

See also
 List of pievi

Church architecture
Architecture in Italy
Catholic Church in Italy